Martyr's Memorial C-Division League (Nepali: शहीद स्मारक सि डिभिजन लीग) is the third tier association football league of Nepali football league system after the Martyr's Memorial A-Division League and the Martyr's Memorial B-Division League. It is run by the All Nepal Football Association.

Structure
The league is the third highest and lowest centrally organized league in Nepal. The winners of qualification tournaments among smaller clubs throughout the country will qualify to participate in the league, while relegation results in a non-league status for the teams.

Teams

Seasons

Notes

References

4
Nepal
2003 establishments in Nepal